62nd New York Film Critics Circle Awards
announced: December 12, 1996given: January 5, 1997

Best Picture:
 Fargo 
The 62nd New York Film Critics Circle Awards, honoring the best in film for 1996, were announced on December 12, 1996, and given on January 5, 1997.

Winners
Best Actor:
Geoffrey Rush - Shine
Runners-up: Daniel Day-Lewis - The Crucible, Kevin Costner - Tin Cup and Tom Cruise - Jerry Maguire
Actress: 
Emily Watson - Breaking the Waves
Runners-up: Frances McDormand - Fargo and Nicole Kidman - The Portrait of a Lady
Best Cinematography: 
Robby Müller - Breaking the Waves and Dead Man
Best Director: 
Lars von Trier - Breaking the Waves
Best Documentary: 
When We Were Kings
Best Film:
Fargo
Runners-up: The People vs. Larry Flynt and Breaking the Waves
Best Foreign Language Film:
The White Balloon • Iran
Best New Director: 
Stanley Tucci and Campbell Scott - Big Night
Best Screenplay: 
Albert Brooks and Monica Johnson - Mother
Best Supporting Actor: 
Harry Belafonte - Kansas City
Runners-up: Martin Donovan - The Portrait of a Lady and Tony Shalhoub - Big Night
Best Supporting Actress: 
Courtney Love - The People vs. Larry Flynt
Runner-up: Barbara Hershey - The Portrait of a Lady
Most Distinguished Re-issue: 
Vertigo
Special Citation: 
Jonas Mekas; to the president of the Anthology Film Archives for his long contributions to independent film.

References

External links
1996 Awards

1996
New York Film Critics Circle Awards
1996 in American cinema
New York
1996 in New York City